Podmoklany is a municipality and village in Havlíčkův Brod District in the Vysočina Region of the Czech Republic. It has about 100 inhabitants.

Administrative parts
Hamlets of Branišov and Hudeč are administrative parts of Podmoklany.

References

Villages in Havlíčkův Brod District